St Michael's Catholic Church is a Catholic church located on Moor Street in Birmingham, England. It received Grade II listed building status on 25 April 1952.

History

The building itself was first erected in 1726, but was burnt down the 1791 Priestley Riots, which targeted Dr. Joseph Priestley who was the minister at the Unitarian since 1780. The Unitarian New Meeting House was rebuilt ten years later and reopened in 1803.

When the New Meeting House became unsuitable for congregation, they started construction on a new place of worship on Broad Street.  The New Meeting House was purchased, remodelled and consecrated as a Roman Catholic church in 1862, at the time catering for a large influx of Irish and Italian immigrants who had settled in the area, leading to the church being known as "the Italian church".

Following World War II, the church was adopted by the exiled Polish ex-servicemen and their families, and again has seen an influx in Polish congregations following the integration of Poland into the European Union in 2004, causing the congregation to grow fourfold. This has led to the creation of separate Polish Mass services.

Prior to moving into St Michael's Church, the first Catholic mission in Birmingham was founded in Masshouse Lane in 1687 by the Franciscan Fathers. When this was burnt down in anti-Catholic riots in 1688, Mass continued to be offered in various improvised chapels until 1862.

References

External links
 St Michael, Birmingham in the Archdiocese of Birmingham

Moor Street
Moor Street
Grade II listed churches in the West Midlands (county)
1726 establishments in Great Britain
Churches completed in 1862
Rebuilt churches in the United Kingdom
19th-century Roman Catholic church buildings in the United Kingdom
Grade II listed Roman Catholic churches in England
Unitarian chapels in England